The 2017 United Kingdom local elections were held on Thursday 4 May 2017. Local elections were held across Great Britain, with elections to 35 English local authorities and all councils in Scotland and Wales.

Newly created combined authority mayors were directly elected in six areas of England: Cambridgeshire and Peterborough, Greater Manchester, the Liverpool City Region, Tees Valley, the West Midlands, and the West of England. In addition, Doncaster and North Tyneside re-elected local authority mayors. Local by-elections for 107 council seats also took place on 4 May.

The Conservative Party led under Prime Minister Theresa May enjoyed the best local election performance in a decade, making significant gains at the expense of the Labour Party. The UK Independence Party lost every seat they were defending, but gained just one seat at the expense of the Labour Party. The Liberal Democrats lost 41 seats, despite their vote share increasing. The Conservatives won four out of six metro-mayoral areas, including in the traditionally Labour-voting Tees Valley and West Midlands.

The local elections were followed by a general election on 8 June.

Eligibility to vote
All registered electors (British, Irish, Commonwealth and European Union citizens) who were aged 18 or over (or aged 16 or over in Scotland) on polling day were entitled to vote in the local elections. A person who had two homes (such as a university student having a term-time address and living at home during holidays) could register to vote at both addresses as long as they were not in the same electoral area, and could vote in the local elections for the two different local councils.

Individuals had to be registered to vote by midnight twelve working days before polling day (13 April 2017 in England and Wales; 17 April 2017 in Scotland). Anyone qualifying as an anonymous elector had until midnight on 25 April 2017 to register.

Seats held prior to the election
In total, 4,851 council seats were up for election in 88 councils; additionally six new mayors were directly elected. Approximately 10,000 people were candidates for election. All 32 councils in Scotland (1,227 seats) and all 22 councils in Wales (1,254 seats) were up for election; an additional 34 councils (2,370 seats) in England were up for election. Of the 35 English councils up for election, 27 were county councils, seven were unitary authorities, and one was the Doncaster Metropolitan Borough Council.

According to a BBC News estimate, taking into account boundary changes, the major political parties were effectively defending the following notional results in council seats on election day:
 Labour – 1,535 seats
 Conservatives – 1,336 seats
 Lib Dems – 484 seats
 SNP – 438 seats	
 Plaid Cymru – 170 seats
 UKIP – 146 seats
 Green Party – 34 seats

There were also 687 independent councillors and 4 Mebyon Kernow councillors. The remaining 217 seats were held by residents' associations and minor parties. A by-election for the parliamentary constituency of Manchester Gorton (caused by the death of Sir Gerald Kaufman, the sitting MP) was due to be held on the same day as the local election, but the by-election was cancelled after the general election was called for the following month.

Results

Overall results - Great Britain

As elections were not held throughout the country, the BBC calculated a Projected National Vote Share (PNV), which aims to assess what the council results indicate the UK-wide vote would be "if the results were repeated at a general election". The BBC's preliminary Projected National Vote Share was 38% for the Conservatives, 27% for Labour, 18% for the Liberal Democrats and 5% for the UK Independence Party, with others on around 12%.

This is the highest vote share for the Conservatives in local elections since 2008, when they faced Labour a decade into government and suffering from the financial crisis. The Liberal Democrats have performed better than at any election since 2010, whilst Labour has not performed so badly since 2010.

UKIP lost 145 of their 146 seats. Prominent former UKIP members talked of the party being finished and that it should disband.

Results by nation

England

Note that unlike in Scotland and Wales, where all local authorities were up for election, the England results are for only 34 councils out of 353, and should not be taken as reflective of the whole of England.

Wales

For comparative purposes, the table above shows changes since 2012 across 21 local authorities and the 2013 result from Anglesey Council.

Scotland
Following boundary changes:

|-style="background-color:#E9E9E9;text-align:center font-size:95%;";"
!colspan="2" rowspan="2" width="175"|Party
!colspan="3" rowspan="2" width="175"| First-preference votes
! scope="col" rowspan="2"| Councils
! scope="col" rowspan="2" style="width: 30px;"| +/-
! colspan="2" | 2012 seats
! colspan="2" | 2017 seats
! colspan="2" | Seat change
|-
! Seats won
!  Notional
!  Seats won
! Seat %
!  vs Notional
|-
|- style="text-align:right;"
| style="background-color:"|
| style="text-align:left;" |Scottish National Party
|610,454
|32.3%
| 0.0
|0
|style="background-color:#ffe8e8;"| 1
|425
|438
|431
|35.1%
|style="background-color:#ffe8e8;"| 7
|- style="text-align:right;"
| style="background-color:"|
| style="text-align:left;" |Conservative
|478,073
|25.3%
| 12.0%
|0
| 
|115
|112
|276
|22.5%
|style="background-color:#dfd"| 164
|- style="text-align:right;"
| style="background-color:"|
| style="text-align:left;" |Labour
|380,957
|20.2%
| 11.4%
|0
|style="background-color:#ffe8e8;"| 3
|394
|395
|262
|21.4%
|style="background-color:#ffe8e8;"| 133
|-
|- style="text-align:right;"
| style="background-color:"|
| style="text-align:left;" |Independents
|196,438
|10.4%
| 1.4%
|3
| 
|196
|198
|168
|14.1%
|style="background-color:#ffe8e8;"| 30
|- style="text-align:right;"
| style="background-color:"|
| style="text-align:left;" |Liberal Democrats
|130,243
|6.9%
| 0.3%
|0
| 
|71
|70
|67
|5.5%
|style="background-color:#ffe8e8;"| 3
|- style="text-align:right;"
| style="background-color:"|
| style="text-align:left;" |Green
|77,682
|4.1%
| 1.8%
|0
| 
|14
|14
|19
|1.6%
|style="background-color:#dfd"| 5
|- style="text-align:right;"
| style="background-color:"|
| style="text-align:left;" |Orkney Manifesto Group
|894
|0.0%
|
|0
|
|
|
|2
|0.1%
|style="background-color:#dfd"| New
|- style="text-align:right;"
| style="background-color:"|
| style="text-align:left;" |West Dunbartonshire Community
|2,413
|0.1%
|
|0
|
|
|
|1
|0.1%
|style="background-color:#dfd"| New
|- style="text-align:right;"
| style="background-color:"|
| style="text-align:left;" |The Rubbish Party
|784
|0.0%
|
|0
|
|
|
|1
|0.1%
|style="background-color:#dfd"| New
|- style="text-align:right;"
| style="background-color:"|
| style="text-align:left;" |UK Independence Party
|2,920
|0.2%
|0.1%
|0
|
|
|
|
|0.0%
|
|- style="text-align:right;"
|
| style="text-align:left;" |Independent Alliance North Lanarkshire
|2,823
|0.2%
|
|0
|
|
|
|
|0.0%
|
|- style="text-align:right;"
| style="background-color:"|
| style="text-align:left;" |TUSC
|1,403
|0.1%
|
|0
|
|
|
|
|0.0%
|
|- style="text-align:right;"
| style="background-color:"|
| style="text-align:left;" |A Better Britain – Unionist Party
|1,196
|0.1%
|
|0
|
|
|
|
|0.0%
|
|- style="text-align:right;"
| style="background-color:"|
| style="text-align:left;" |Scottish Socialist
|928
|0.0%
|0.3%
|0
|
|1
|
|0
|0.0%
|style="background-color:#ffe8e8;"| 1
|- style="text-align:right;"
| style="background-color:"|
| style="text-align:left;" |Solidarity
|883
|0.0%
|
|0
|
|
|
|
|0.0%
|
|- style="text-align:right;"
| style="background-color:"|
| style="text-align:left;" |Libertarian
|776
|0.0%
|
|0
|
|
|
|
|0.0%
|
|- style="text-align:right;"
| style="background-color:"|
| style="text-align:left;" |RISE
|186
|0.0%
|
|0
|
|
|
|
|0.0%
|
|- style="text-align:right;"
|
| style="text-align:left;" |Scottish Independent Network
|145
|0.0%
|
|0
|
|
|
|
|0.0%
|
|- style="text-align:right;"
| style="background-color:"|
| style="text-align:left;" |Scottish Unionist
|129
|0.0%
|
|0
|
|
|
|
|0.0%
|
|- style="text-align:right;"
| style="background-color:"|
| style="text-align:left;" |Social Democratic
|112
|0.0%
|
|0
|
|
|
|
|0.0%
|
|- style="text-align:right;"
| style="background-color:"|
| style="text-align:left;" |Scottish Christian
|104
|0.0%
|
|0
|
|
|
|
|0.0%
|
|- style="text-align:right;"
| style="background-color:"|
| style="text-align:left;" |Socialist Labour
|76
|0.0%
|
|0
|
|
|
|
|0.0%
|
|- style="text-align:right;"
| style="background-color:"|
| style="text-align:left;" |National Front
|39
|0.0%
|
|0
|
|
|
|
|0.0%
|
|-
|- style="text-align:right;"
| style="background-color:"|
| style="text-align:left;" |No Overall Control
| —
| —
| —
| 29
|style="background-color:#dfd;"| 4
| —
| —
| —
| —
| —
|-
! colspan="2" style="text-align:left;" |Total
|style="background-color:#E9E9E9;text-align:right;" | 1,889,658
|style="background-color:#E9E9E9;text-align:right;" |100.0
|style="background-color:#E9E9E9;text-align:right;" | ±0.0
|style="background-color:#E9E9E9;text-align:right;" |32
|style="background-color:#E9E9E9;text-align:right;" | 
|style="background-color:#E9E9E9;text-align:right;" |1,223
|style="background-color:#E9E9E9;text-align:right;" |1,227
|style="background-color:#E9E9E9;text-align:right;" |1,227
|style="background-color:#E9E9E9;text-align:right;" | 100.00
|style="background-color:#E9E9E9;text-align:right;" | 
|}<noinclude>
The table has been arranged according to popular vote, not the number of seats won.

There were boundary changes in many of these councils, with an increase in council seats across the country from 1,223 to 1,227, making direct comparisons with the 2012 results problematic. Notional seats and seat change are based on a notional 2012 result calculated by the BBC.

Maps

England

Non-metropolitan county councils
All 27 county councils for areas with a two-tier structure of local governance had all of their seats up for election. These were first-past-the-post elections in a mixture of single-member and multi-member electoral divisions.

These were the last elections to Dorset and Northamptonshire county councils.

 ‡ New electoral division boundaries 
 † The Conservatives lost control in 2013, and were replaced by a Labour/UKIP/Lib Dem coalition with Independent/Green support. The Conservatives regained the council leadership in May 2016 after the Green Party abstained in the annual Council leadership election, and by-elections and defections later brought the Conservative total to 42 seats, giving them exactly 50% of the seats.

Unitary authorities
Seven single-tier unitary authorities held elections, with all of their seats up for election. These were first-past-the-post elections in a mixture of single-member and multi-member electoral divisions or wards.

Metropolitan boroughs 
One metropolitan borough, the Metropolitan Borough of Doncaster, had all of its seats up for election, after moving to whole council elections in 2015. This was a first-past-the-post election in a mixture of two-member and three-member wards.

Mayoral elections

Combined authority mayors 
Six elections were held for directly elected regional mayors. These newly established positions lead combined authorities set up by groups of local councils, as part of devolution deals giving the combined authorities additional powers and funding.

Other planned mayoralties have been postponed or cancelled. The election of the Sheffield City Region Combined Authority mayor was postponed in January 2017 and, following legal action, did not occur until the 2018 local elections. The North East Combined Authority deal was scrapped as several councils in the region voted down the proposal, however the smaller North of Tyne combined authority was approved by the councils and by parliament for the 2019 local elections. The other devolution deals that were scrapped were for the Norfolk and Suffolk, Greater Lincolnshire and the Solent.

There were concerns at the low turnout recorded.

Local authority mayors
Two elections for directly elected local district mayors will be held. These Mayors act as council leaders in their local authorities.

Scotland

Wales

 † In 2014, the only Welsh Liberal Democrat cabinet member defected to Welsh Labour; thus the Liberal Democrats left the coalition. In 2015, several Independent councillors created their own group within the council called Conwy First. This group later on went to support the council instead of the remaining five independent councillors, so that the coalition was then made up of Plaid Cymru, Welsh Labour and Conwy First.
 ‡ The Welsh Liberal Democrats later lost their only seat on the Council, thereby leaving the coalition.
 †† At the original election Plaid Cymru won exactly half the seats; they later took control of the council by winning a by-election.

See also
 2017 City of London Corporation election

Notes

References

 
2017 elections in the United Kingdom
2017
May 2017 events in the United Kingdom